Calophyllum euryphyllum is a species of flowering plant in the Calophyllaceae family. It is found in Indonesia and Papua New Guinea.

References

euryphyllum
Trees of the Maluku Islands
Trees of New Guinea
Flora of the Bismarck Archipelago
Least concern plants
Taxonomy articles created by Polbot